In various SQL implementations, a hint is an addition to the SQL standard that instructs the database engine on how to execute the query. For example, a hint may tell the engine to use or not to use an index (even if the query optimizer would decide otherwise).

Implementation 
Different database engines use different approaches in implementing hints. 

 Oracle implements hints by using specially-crafted comments in the query that begin with a  symbol, thus not affecting SQL compatibility.
 EDB Postgres Advanced Server (a proprietary version of PostgreSQL from EnterpriseDB) offers hints compatible with those of Oracle.
 Microsoft SQL Server offers hints via the  keyword

See also
 Query optimizer
 Query plan

References

SQL